Siou may refer to:
Siou, Togo
Siou, Burkina Faso